Osteochilus ingeri is a species of cyprinid fish endemic to Sabah.

Etymology
It was named in honor of Robert F. Inger (1920-2019), from the Field Museum of Natural History (Chicago), who collected type.

References

Taxa named by Jaranthada Karnasuta
Fish described in 1993
Osteochilus